It's Only Love is a 1975 album by Rita Coolidge and was released on the A&M Records label.

Track listing

Side one
"Born to Love Me" (Bob Morrison) – 3:38
"I Wanted It All" (Jackie DeShannon, John Bettis) – 3:05
"Keep The Candle Burning" (Bennie Gallagher, Graham Lyle) – 3:12
"Don't Let Love Pass You By" (Donnie Fritts, Eddie Hinton) – 3:38
"It's Only Love" (Bob Morrison) – 3:25

Side two
"Star" (Donna Weiss) – 3:26
"Late Again" (Kris Kristofferson) – 4:10
"My Rock and Roll Man" (Troy Seals, Mentor Williams, Eddie Setser) – 3:16
"Mean to Me" (Roy Turk, Fred Ahlert) – 4:37
"Am I Blue" (Grant Clarke, Harry Akst) – 4:37

Personnel
Rita Coolidge – vocals
Mike Utley – keyboards
Jerry McGee, Dean Parks, Fred Tackett – guitars
Lee Sklar – bass
Sammy Creason – drums
Bobbye Hall – percussion
Al Perkins – pedal steel guitar
Booker T. Jones – organ on "Star"

"Mean To Me" and "Am I Blue" performed by Barbara Carroll, piano; Chuck Domanico, bass; Colin Bailey, drums

Singers
Venetta Fields, Clyde King, Sherlie Matthews, Brooks Hunniutt, Jennifer Warnes, Petsye Powell, Rita Coolidge

Orchestral Arrangements:  David Campbell
Horn Arrangements for "Keep The Candle Burning":  Jim Horn

Recorded and Mixed at  Sunset Sound Studios, Los Angeles
Recording Engineers:  John Haeny and Kent Nebergall
Re-mix Engineer:  Marty Lewis
Mastering by Doug Sax at the Mastering Lab, Los Angeles
Art Direction:  Roland Young
Design:  Junie Osaki
Photography:  Bob Jenkins
Artist Management:  Bert Block Management

Charts

References

Rita Coolidge albums
1975 albums
Albums arranged by David Campbell (composer)
Albums produced by David Anderle
A&M Records albums
Albums recorded at Sunset Sound Recorders